In mathematics, specifically in the study of dynamical systems, an orbit is a collection of points related by the evolution function of the dynamical system. It can be understood as the subset of phase space covered by the trajectory of the dynamical system under a particular set of initial conditions, as the system evolves. As a phase space trajectory is uniquely determined for any given set of phase space coordinates, it is not possible for different orbits to intersect in phase space, therefore the set of all orbits of a dynamical system is a partition of the phase space. Understanding the properties of orbits by using topological methods is one of the objectives of the modern theory of dynamical systems.  

For discrete-time dynamical systems, the orbits are sequences; for real dynamical systems, the orbits are curves; and for holomorphic dynamical systems, the orbits are Riemann surfaces.

Definition 

Given a dynamical system (T, M, Φ) with T a group, M a set and Φ the evolution function

 where  with 

we define

then the set

is called orbit through x. An orbit which consists of a single point is called constant orbit.
.

Real dynamical system 

For any x in M

is called positive semi-orbit through x and

is called negative semi-orbit through x.

Discrete time dynamical system 
For discrete time dynamical system  :

forward orbit of x is a set : 

backward orbit of x is a set :

and orbit of x is a set :

where :
  is an evolution function  which is here an iterated function,
 set  is dynamical space,
 is number of iteration, which is natural number and 
 is initial state of system and  

Usually different notation is used :

 is written as 

General dynamical system 
For a general dynamical system, especially in homogeneous dynamics, when one has a "nice" group  acting on a probability space  in a measure-preserving way, an orbit  will be called periodic (or equivalently, closed) if the stabilizer  is a lattice inside .

In addition, a related term is a bounded orbit, when the set  is pre-compact inside .

The classification of orbits can lead to interesting questions with relations to other mathematical areas, for example the Oppenheim conjecture (proved by Margulis) and the Littlewood conjecture (partially proved by Lindenstrauss) are dealing with the question whether every bounded orbit of some natural action on the homogeneous space  is indeed periodic one, this observation is due to Raghunathan and in different language due to Cassels and Swinnerton-Dyer . Such questions are intimately related to deep measure-classification theorems.

Notes 

It is often the case that the evolution function can be understood to compose the elements of a group, in which case the group-theoretic orbits of the group action are the same thing as the dynamical orbits.

Examples 

 The orbit of an equilibrium point is a constant orbit.

Stability of orbits 

A basic classification of orbits is
 constant orbits or fixed points
 periodic orbits
 non-constant and non-periodic orbits

An orbit can fail to be closed in two ways. 
It could be an asymptotically periodic orbit if it converges to a periodic orbit.  Such orbits are not closed because they never truly repeat, but they become arbitrarily close to a repeating orbit.
An orbit can also be chaotic.  These orbits come arbitrarily close to the initial point, but fail to ever converge to a periodic orbit.  They exhibit sensitive dependence on initial conditions, meaning that small differences in the initial value will cause large differences in future points of the orbit.

There are other properties of orbits that allow for different classifications.  An orbit can be hyperbolic if nearby points approach or diverge from the orbit exponentially fast.

See also
 Wandering set
 Phase space method
 Cobweb plot or Verhulst diagram
 Periodic points of complex quadratic mappings and multiplier of orbit
 Orbit portrait

References
 
 
 

Dynamical systems
Group actions (mathematics)